The 2017 season was Terengganu's 1st season in Liga Premier since relegated in 2016 season.

Coaching staff

Squad information

First-team squad

Transfers
First transfer window started in December 2017 to 22 January 2017 and second transfer window started on 15 May 2017 to 11 June 2017.

In

December to January

May to June

Out

December to January

June to July

Competitions

Liga Premier

League table

Result summary

Results by matchday

Matches

Piala FA

Piala Malaysia

On 22 May 2017, the group stages were confirmed with Terengganu facing Selangor, Johor Darul Ta'zim and Sarawak in Group D.

Group stage

Statistics

Appearances

Top scorers

The list is sorted by shirt number when total goals are equal.

* Player names in bold denotes player that left mid-season

Clean sheets

The list is sorted by shirt number when total clean sheets are equal.

References

Terengganu FC seasons
Malaysian football clubs 2017 season
Malaysian football club seasons by club